Uzuakoli is an area in Abia State of Eastern Nigeria that includes several villages. It has been home to a Methodist College, a large market, clandestine slave trading, a leprosy settlement, Ila Oso Festival, and conflict. The community is in the Igbo "heartland".

The University of California has a photograph of Methodist missionaries in Uzuakoli in 1924.

In 1964, students of Methodist College of Uzuakoli wrote a short history of the area.

Other photos of area residents are in archives.

See also
Operation Leopard (1969)

Further reading
Uzuakoli Miracle; A True Story Of Bush Babies In Nigeria by Alan Cox

References

Abia State